Mount Wilbur is located in the Lewis Range, Glacier National Park in the U.S. state of Montana. The west slopes of the peak join to ridges along the continental divide. Much of the climbing routes are rated at class 4 to 5, with some only used once. The sedimentary rock of the mountains makes for often poor anchoring points and enhances the difficulty. A cirque on the north slopes of the mountain shelters Iceberg Lake, a popular hiking destination from Many Glacier. The mountain was named by George Bird Grinnell in 1885, for Edward R. Wilbur of New York, one of Grinnell's partners in the Forest and Stream Publishing Company (forerunner of Field & Stream magazine), and both men were founders of the Audubon Society.

Geology

Like other mountains in Glacier National Park, the peak is composed of sedimentary rock laid down during the Precambrian to Jurassic periods. The bulk of the peak is composed of limestone of the Siyeh Formation, and the conspicuous dark band is a diorite sill.

Climate
Based on the Köppen climate classification, the peak is located in an alpine subarctic climate zone with long, cold, snowy winters, and cool to warm summers. Temperatures can drop below −10 °F with wind chill factors below −30 °F.

Gallery

See also
 List of mountains and mountain ranges of Glacier National Park (U.S.)

References

Mountains of Glacier County, Montana
Mountains of Glacier National Park (U.S.)
Lewis Range
Mountains of Montana
North American 2000 m summits